Morghabad (also Romanized as Morghābād; also known as Murghābād) is a village in Pish Khowr Rural District, Pish Khowr District, Famenin County, Hamadan Province, Iran. At the 2006 census, its population was 216, in 52 families.

References 

Populated places in Famenin County